The Tashkent Institute of Irrigation and Agricultural Mechanization Engineers (TIIAME), formerly Tashkent Institute of Irrigation and Melioration (TIIME) ( (TIQXMMI)) is a university in Central Asia, which works for the development of the water industry, and supplies the country with professionals in this field. Tashkent Institute of Irrigation and Agricultural Mechanization Engineers is located in the Republic of Uzbekistan, Tashkent city, Kari Niyozov street, 39-house.

History
The history of the Tashkent Institute of Irrigation and Agricultural Mechanization Engineers dates back to the Soviet Union. The university was first established in 1923 as the department of Turkistan State University. It was created under the technical faculty and was called Hydro Technical Engineering. In its first year of establishment, 24 agronomists and 16 water conservation specialists graduated from the faculty. The history of this university could be recognized by the second occasion. After six years of opening the Hydro Technical Engineering department, the government decided to establish a new department under the Melioration Engineering Faculty. Those two departments were linked together in 1929, which led to the establishment of Central Asian Cotton Irrigation Polytechnic University. On 11 November 1934, Central Asian Cotton Irrigation Polytechnic University was merged with the Central Asian Institute of Agricultural Industry Irrigation and Mechanization, which was the reason for the creation of the Tashkent Institute of Agricultural Industry Irrigation and Mechanization. In the first years of establishment, there were only two faculties, Hydro Melioration and Mechanization. After World War II, the agricultural industry of the country increased rapidly, which affected the need for professional employees.

After World War II, a number of faculties were created: Building (1945), Mechanization of Hydro Melioration (1946), and Hydro Energetics (1946). In 1974 a new faculty was named Technology of Repairing Agricultural Industry Machines and Creating Them. In 1979 a number of engineering faculties were opened, which was directly linked to the economic growth in Uzbekistan.

After the independence of Uzbekistan, all the textbooks were interpreted into Uzbek language, and most of the classes started to be taught in the native language of Uzbekistan. In 2004, on 30 March by the edict of the Cabinet of Ministers of Uzbekistan, the institute obtained its current name. This meant that the Tashkent Institute of Agricultural Industry Irrigation and Mechanization was renamed to the Tashkent Institute of Irrigation and Melioration. In 2017 institute took the name Tashkent Institute of Irrigation and Agricultural Mechanization Engineers. Nowadays the institute involves five faculties with 30 departments. It has 353 professors and teachers and more than 4860 students.

Campus 
Tashkent Institute of Irrigation and Agricultural Mechanization Engineers consists of four main buildings, three laboratory buildings, scientific centers, an information resource center which has 700 thousand materials in its fund, three dormitories with an overall capacity for 1200 students, a canteen which can serve 484 people at one time and the park.

Rector 
The rector of Tashkent Institute of Irrigation and Agricultural Mechanization Engineers is Umurzakov Uktam Pardaevich, a doctor of economical sciences and professor.

Duties 
Tashkent Institute of Irrigation and Agricultural Mechanization Engineers has set its duties and provided them in the rules of the institute. The six main duties are:
 Supply the individual (student) with intellectual and cultural education, and meet their ethical needs
 Help those individuals (students) to become improved by all of the sides
 To develop the subject by giving attention to volunteers who are creating something new relating to that subject
 To improve the qualification in the economy of interested people
 To keep the nation's ethic and cultural beliefs and enlarge them
 To spread the knowledge among the citizens

Faculties 
Tashkent Institute of Irrigation and Agricultural Mechanization Engineers currently consists of five faculties, which are divided into 36 departments. The seven faculties are as follows:

 Faculty of organization and management of water resources
Hydromelioration
Faculty of mechanization of hydromeliorative works 
Faculty of power supply of agriculture and water management
Faculty of agricultural mechanization
Building of Hydro Technical Construction
Faculty of land management

Faculty of organization and management of water resources

Until the 1970s there were no economists on the water industry in Uzbekistan. This caused some serious problems in water consumption and utilization. In 1974, in order to solve this problem, a new branch was opened under the faculty of Hydro Technical Constructions", called the Economy of Water Industry and its Analysis. In 1976, this branch was set as the independent faculty and started working as one of the biggest parts of the institute. From the first years, about 50 students were invited to the university and in 1979 the first 50 students graduated from this faculty. After the independence of Uzbekistan, in 2015 the faculty was renamed to its current name: Water Industry Management. Nowadays, the dean of the faculty is docent Ibragimov Abdimalik Gapparovich. On the campus of the faculty, there are two language classes, four computer classes, and more than 20 study classes, which are supplied with modern education materials and information technologies.

The Water Industry Management faculty has seven departments:
 Information technologies 
 Water industry economy
 Control under the water industry
 Theoretical economy
 Accounting and audit
 Foreign languages
 English language

Hydromelioration faculty
The history of the Hydro Melioration faculty can be separated into two parts: the Soviet Union times and the period after the independence of Uzbekistan. The past of the faculty is directly linked with the history of the university, which means that the faculty was created in 1923 and was the first faculty in the history of the university. In the first year, only eight students graduated from the faculty, and then there were 274 students and 49 professors. On 16 November 1934, the number of students increased rapidly to 705. The establishment of the faculty led to economic growth in Central Asia. After independence, the faculty was mixed with two different departments. Nowadays it has three main bachelor's degree branches:
 Mechanization of Water Industry and Melioration
 Ecology
 Hydro Energetics

The departments located in the faculty are:
 Ecology
 Physical education
 Physics
 Chemistry

Faculty of power supply of agriculture and water management

Faculty of power supply of agriculture and water management was established after the World War, when there were high demands for workers in the agricultural industry. The faculty was created after mixing the two faculties of Mechanization of Hydro Melioration Works 1946 and Automating the Agricultural Industry 1962. It happened because of the 415th edict which was made by the Cabinet of Ministers of Uzbekistan, on 3 September 2004.

There are four departments in faculty of power supply of agriculture and water management:

 Electricity and renewable energy sources
Technological breakthrough and simplification of automation and optimization
Electrical Engineering and Mechatronics
The use of electrical technologies and electrical appliance

Mechanisation of hydromeliorative works

Life safety department
 Mechanization of hydromeliorative works
The organization and technology of hydrometallic works
 Humanitarian subjects

Faculty of Agriculture Mechanization

Agricultural machinery
 Tractors and Automobiles
Operation and repair of machines
General technical sciences

Faculty of Hydrotechnical Constructions
Nowadays the dean of the Faculty of Hydrotechnical Constructions" is docent B.B. Xasanov. The history of the establishment goes back to 1946, when the first woman irrigator T.A. Kolpakova opened the Building of Small and Medium Hydroelectric-Stations faculty. After some years the faculty was called the Hydro Technical Building. However, big changes to the faculty came in the independence years of Uzbekistan. In 1991 the faculty was considered to be the department due to the changes in infrastructure. During those years, the faculty worked as part of the Center for Preparing the Irrigation Engineers" and from 1996 it became part of the Hydro Melioration faculty" and prepared professionals in the water industry building" field. After the edict made by the Cabinet of Ministers of Uzbekistan, the small department became the fully functioning faculty with the name Building of Irrigation Hydro Technical Constructions and Utilization. The faculty obtained its current name by the 311 edict which was made on 3 November 2015, by the Cabinet of Ministers of Uzbekistan. The four departments involved inside the faculty are:

Hydrotechnical Constructions constructions and engineering designs
 Use of water and pumping stations
Theoretical and construction mechanics
Drawing geometry and engineering graphics

Faculty of land management

The Faculty of land management was first established in 1945 under the name of Land Making. The faculty attained its current name in 2017. Nowadays, the dean of this faculty is Narbaev Sharaf. There are now 670 students involved with studies in this faculty. During its working period, the Utilization of Land and Land Cadaster faculty became one of the biggest educational places in Central Asia. Some students came from Kazakhstan, Turkmenistan, Kirgizia, and Tajikistan. There are three bachelor's degree branches and two master's degree branches in the Utilization of Land and Land Cadaster faculty.

Bachelor's degree branches:
 Cadaster
 Land creation and land cadaster
 Profession education: land creation and land cadaster

Master's degree branches:
 Cartography
 Usage and controlling the land recourses

There are four departments located in this faculty:
 Geodesy and geoinformatics
 Land use
 State cadastres
Higher Mathematics

Students' town 
Students' town was first established in 1987 under the Tashkent Irrigation and Mechanization of Agricultural industry Engineers Institute.  Since 2004 it is considered to be the students' town of the Tashkent Irrigation and Melioration Institute. Students' town consists of three students' dormitories numbered 2, 3, and 4, and with buildings numbered 6 and 7 for the university staff. The director of the students' town is Bozorov Baxtiyor Xakimovich.

Dormitories 
Every dormitory in students' town holds students from various faculties. Dormitory #2 holds 232 students from Automating and Mechanizing the Water Industry faculty and 44 students from Building of Irrigation Hydro Technical Construction and Usage faculty. Overall, dormitory 2 holds 276 students.

Dormitory #3 holds about 410 students from different faculties. There are four female students currently living in dormitory 3 who are from China.

Dormitory #4 holds 385 students from different faculties., including seven international students.

Buildings 6 and 7 mainly serve university staff representatives and young scientists. There are 162 rooms in those buildings and 607 people living there.

Every building is provided with solutions for the essential needs of every individual. There are sport halls, kitchens, reading halls, and restrooms in each level of the buildings. They all are fully provided with gas and electric energy. In addition, there is a small library in the student's town, and it works by its working graphic daily. This means that even though students are may be away from the university, they can deal with their studies in that library. The library provides the students with most of the textbooks. The kitchen rooms of the dormitories are provided with tables, chairs, and ovens. Students can cook there. Each room in the buildings of students' town is fully functional and supplied with an emergency exit. This means that fire emergency problems are covered fully.

Academic lyceums 
There are two academic lyceums which were opened under the name of Tashkent Institute of Irrigation and Melioration. They are Yunusabad Academic Lyceum and International House – Tashkent Lyceum. They were opened to cover high demands for qualified high-school graduates. The representative from the university who works with the lyceums is Makumova Dilrabo Innatovna

Yunusabad Academic Lyceum

Yunusabad Academic Lyceum was first established under the Tashkent Irrigation and Mechanization of Agricultural Industry Engineers Institute in 1987, with another name of Universal Technical Lyceum". However, after the independence of Uzbekistan by the edict of the Cabinet of Ministers of Uzbekistan on 23 September 1998, the name of the lyceum must have been changed. This edict was done only after the year, on 2 September 1999, and was renamed and re-established by the edict number 406 to Yunusabad Academic Lyceum. There are three faculties in this academic lyceum: Exact Sciences, Natural Sciences, and Social-Humanitarian Subjects.

Exact Sciences faculty:
 Physics, math (technical branch)
 Math, English language (economical branch)

Natural Sciences faculty:
 Chemistry, biology (medical branch)

Social-Humanitarian Subjects faculty:
History, English language, law (history branch)

Only prospective students who have successfully completed the nine year secondary program can apply to the university. Then they can be examined by the lyceum administration. Students from other regions are provided with dormitories.

There are five departments in Yunusabad Academic Lyceum:
 Mathematics department;
 Natural Sciences department
 Uzbek Language and Literature department
 Foreign Languages department
 Social-Humanitarian Subjects department

International House – Tashkent lyceum 

International House in Tashkent is one of the two lyceums which were established under the name of Tashkent Institute of Irrigation and Agricultural Mechanization Engineers. However, the lyceum first was opened as the education center in 1993, in order to inherit educational processes and techniques from the developed countries of the United Kingdom and the US. The lyceum was located in the center of the Tashkent city, and it is easy to find its location, by the metro station Hamid Olimjon. In 2007 by the edict of Islam Karimov, the simple education center was fully set to be the academic lyceum, and was given under the Tashkent Institute of Irrigation and Melioration. In 2009, for making the academic lyceum fully standard with the world's requirements, reconstruction works were established. The education in the lyceum is based on the Uzbekistan's educational standards, and held in two different faculties, Exact Sciences and Social-Humanitarian Sciences.

In 2011 International House academic lyceum published their own magazine catalog, which tells all about the lyceum. The magazine was named We are Inter House! The materials for the magazine were collected from the year of 2009. Nowadays about 300 students are studying at the International House lyceum and there are two professors, four docents and a number of highly qualified teachers.

References

See also 

Turin Polytechnic University in Tashkent
 Inha University in Tashkent
 Tashkent State Technical University
 Tashkent Financial Institute
 Tashkent Automobile and Road Construction Institute
 Management Development Institute of Singapore in Tashkent
 Tashkent State University of Economics
 Tashkent State Agrarian University
 Tashkent State University of Law
 Tashkent University of Information Technologies
 University of World Economy and Diplomacy
 Westminster International University in Tashkent

Education in Tashkent
Tashkhent
Hydrology organizations
Buildings and structures in Tashkent
Educational institutions established in 1923
Universities and institutes established in the Soviet Union
1923 establishments in the Soviet Union